Rita Martinez was a Chicana activist operating in Pueblo, Colorado. She is notable for her activism against the observance of Columbus Day in Colorado. Her efforts came to fruition in 2020, when Colorado Governor Jared Polis signed a bill abolishing Columbus Day.

Activism
Martinez began her life as an activist in the 1970s when she worked for the newspaper La Cucaracha where she was a reporter and photographer. One of the first issues she took up was police brutality and accountability. With her husband she helped organize Pueblo's Cinco de Mayo festivities for at least 45 years.

In 1992, the 500th anniversary of Columbus' arrival in the Americas, Martinez took part in protests against the Columbus Day parade, held in Denver, which has since been disbanded. Martinez, Esteban and Freddy "Freak" Trujillo founded the Colorado Chicano Movement archives at Colorado State University in Pueblo.

In 2020 her activism came to fruition when Colorado Governor Jared Polis signed a bill abolishing Columbus Day and creating Mother Cabrini Day instead. From June to November 2020 she led weekly protests to remove a statue of Christopher Columbus form Mesa Junction in Pueblo, Colorado. Martinez did not live to see the statue of Columbus removed from Mesa Junction. She died on December 10, 2020, from COVID-19, after 13 days in Parkview Medical Center.

Personal life
She met her husband Jose Esteban Ortega, at La Cucaracha, the newspaper she worked for in the late 70s. Together Martinez and Esteban had three children, daughter Neva, and sons Tomas and Vicente.

References 

1955 births
2020 deaths
People from Pueblo, Colorado
Activists from Colorado
American activists of Mexican descent
Women civil rights activists
21st-century American women